The Park Connector Network (PCN) of Singapore is a network of walking/running/cycling paths that connects the various parks and other green spaces in Singapore. Both the parks and the PCN are managed by National Parks Board (NParks).

As part of the National Cycling Plan to promote cycling, the Land Transport Authority (LTA) is constructing networks of cycling paths within towns. These cycling paths connect with the PCN, enabling people to safely cycle both intra-town (e.g., from home to MRT station) and inter-town (longer distance cycling).

History 
The proposal to form a park connector network was approved in 1991 by The Garden City Action Committee. In 1995, The Kallang Park Connector became the first park connector to be implemented. Stretching over nine kilometres, the park connector links two regional parks: Bishan Park and Kallang Riverside Park. In December 2007, the Eastern Coastal Loop, a 42-kilometre loop, was completed, providing a link from East Coast Park to Changi Beach Park. By January 2012, 200 kilometres of the PCN has been completed. In 2015, NParks has completed 300 kilometres of the PCN, along with the Central Urban Loop.

List

Loops 
 Central Urban Loop
 Eastern Coastal Loop
 Northern Explorer Loop
 North Eastern Riverine Loop
 Southern Ridges Loop
 Western Adventure Loop

Individual Park Connectors

See also
 List of parks in Singapore

References

External links
 Official site
 National Parks Board, Singapore
 A Green Network for Singapore, Kiat W. Tan

1995 establishments in Singapore
Parks established in 1995
Cycling in Singapore
Parks in Singapore
Singapore geography-related lists
Singapore nature-related lists
Sports venues in Singapore